Astrid Fugellie (born in 1949 in Punta Arenas) is a Chilean poet.

She studied to be a school teacher at the University of Chile and she worked as a school teacher in Santiago.

She is the founder of the Culture House in Punta Arenas and of the magazine El Corchete, and she presents several radio program.

Works
 1966 Poemas
 1969 Siete poemas
 1975 Una casa en la lluvia
 1982 Quién es quién en las letras chilenas
 1984 Las jornadas del silencio
 1986 Travesías
 1987 Chile enlutado
 1987 A manos del año
 1988 Los círculos
 1991 Dioses del sueño
 1999 Llaves para una maga
 2003 De ánimas y mandas, animitas chilenas desde el subsuelo
 2005 La tierra de los arlequines, ese arco que se forma después de la lluvia
 2005 La generación de las palomas

Prizes
 1988 Premio de la Academia Chilena de la Lengua, por Los círculos.
 Concurso literario Rostro de Chile.
 Diploma de honor en el concurso literario La Prensa Austral.

References

External links
 Poemas y textos en letrasdechile.cl
 Comentario al libro La generación de las palomas

1949 births
Date of birth missing (living people)
Living people
Chilean women poets
Chilean people of Croatian descent
20th-century Chilean poets
21st-century Chilean poets
20th-century Chilean women writers
21st-century Chilean women writers